Kunzig is a surname. Notable people with the surname include:

 Robert Lowe Kunzig (1918–1982), American attorney and judge
 Robert Kunzig, American science journalist